Naturally occurring xenon (54Xe) consists of seven stable isotopes and two very long-lived isotopes. Double electron capture has been observed in 124Xe (half-life ) and double beta decay in 136Xe (half-life ), which are among the longest measured half-lives of all nuclides. The isotopes 126Xe and 134Xe are also predicted to undergo double beta decay, but this has never been observed in these isotopes, so they are considered to be stable. Beyond these stable forms, 32 artificial unstable isotopes and various isomers have been studied, the longest-lived of which is 127Xe with a half-life of 36.345 days. All other isotopes have half-lives less than 12 days, most less than 20 hours. The shortest-lived isotope, 108Xe, has a half-life of 58 μs, and is the heaviest known nuclide with equal numbers of protons and neutrons. Of known isomers, the longest-lived is 131mXe with a half-life of 11.934 days. 129Xe is produced by beta decay of 129I (half-life: 16 million years); 131mXe, 133Xe, 133mXe, and 135Xe are some of the fission products of both 235U and 239Pu, so are used as indicators of nuclear explosions.

The artificial isotope 135Xe is of considerable significance in the operation of nuclear fission reactors. 135Xe has a huge cross section for thermal neutrons, 2.65×106 barns, so it acts as a neutron absorber or "poison" that can slow or stop the chain reaction after a period of operation. This was discovered in the earliest nuclear reactors built by the American Manhattan Project for plutonium production.  Because of this effect, designers must make provisions to increase the reactor's reactivity (the number of neutrons per fission that go on to fission other atoms of nuclear fuel) over the initial value needed to start the chain reaction. For the same reason, the fission products produced in a nuclear explosion and a power plant differ significantly as a large share of  will absorb neutrons in a steady state reactor, while basically none of the  will have had time to decay to Xenon before the explosion of the bomb removes it from the neutron radiation.

Relatively high concentrations of radioactive xenon isotopes are also found emanating from nuclear reactors due to the release of this fission gas from cracked fuel rods or fissioning of uranium in cooling water. The concentrations of these isotopes are still usually low compared to the naturally occurring radioactive noble gas 222Rn.

Because xenon is a tracer for two parent isotopes, Xe isotope ratios in meteorites are a powerful tool for studying the formation of the solar system. The I-Xe method of dating gives the time elapsed between nucleosynthesis and the condensation of a solid object from the solar nebula (xenon being a gas, only that part of it that formed after condensation will be present inside the object). Xenon isotopes are also a powerful tool for understanding terrestrial differentiation. Excess 129Xe found in carbon dioxide well gases from New Mexico was believed to be from the decay of mantle-derived gases soon after Earth's formation. It has been suggested that the isotopic composition of atmospheric xenon fluctuated prior to the GOE before stabilizing, perhaps as a result of the rise in atmospheric O2.

List of isotopes 

|-
| 108Xe
| style="text-align:right" | 54
| style="text-align:right" | 54
| 
| 
| α
| 104Te
| 0+
|
|
|-
| 109Xe
| style="text-align:right" | 54
| style="text-align:right" | 55
| 
| 13(2) ms
| α
| 105Te
|
|
|
|-
| rowspan=2|110Xe
| rowspan=2 style="text-align:right" | 54
| rowspan=2 style="text-align:right" | 56
| rowspan=2|109.94428(14)
| rowspan=2|310(190) ms[]
| β+
| 110I
| rowspan=2|0+
| rowspan=2|
| rowspan=2|
|-
| α
| 106Te
|-
| rowspan=2|111Xe
| rowspan=2 style="text-align:right" | 54
| rowspan=2 style="text-align:right" | 57
| rowspan=2|110.94160(33)#
| rowspan=2|740(200) ms
| β+ (90%)
| 111I
| rowspan=2|5/2+#
| rowspan=2|
| rowspan=2|
|-
| α (10%)
| 107Te
|-
| rowspan=2|112Xe
| rowspan=2 style="text-align:right" | 54
| rowspan=2 style="text-align:right" | 58
| rowspan=2|111.93562(11)
| rowspan=2|2.7(8) s
| β+ (99.1%)
| 112I
| rowspan=2|0+
| rowspan=2|
| rowspan=2|
|-
| α (.9%)
| 108Te
|-
| rowspan=4|113Xe
| rowspan=4 style="text-align:right" | 54
| rowspan=4 style="text-align:right" | 59
| rowspan=4|112.93334(9)
| rowspan=4|2.74(8) s
| β+ (92.98%)
| 113I
| rowspan=4|(5/2+)#
| rowspan=4|
| rowspan=4|
|-
| β+, p (7%)
| 112Te
|-
| α (.011%)
| 109Te
|-
| β+, α (.007%)
| 109Sb
|-
| 114Xe
| style="text-align:right" | 54
| style="text-align:right" | 60
| 113.927980(12)
| 10.0(4) s
| β+
| 114I
| 0+
|
|
|-
| rowspan=3|115Xe
| rowspan=3 style="text-align:right" | 54
| rowspan=3 style="text-align:right" | 61
| rowspan=3|114.926294(13)
| rowspan=3|18(4) s
| β+ (99.65%)
| 115I
| rowspan=3|(5/2+)
| rowspan=3|
| rowspan=3|
|-
| β+, p (.34%)
| 114Te
|-
| β+, α (3×10−4%)
| 111Sb
|-
| 116Xe
| style="text-align:right" | 54
| style="text-align:right" | 62
| 115.921581(14)
| 59(2) s
| β+
| 116I
| 0+
|
|
|-
| rowspan=2|117Xe
| rowspan=2 style="text-align:right" | 54
| rowspan=2 style="text-align:right" | 63
| rowspan=2|116.920359(11)
| rowspan=2|61(2) s
| β+ (99.99%)
| 117I
| rowspan=2|5/2(+)
| rowspan=2|
| rowspan=2|
|-
| β+, p (.0029%)
| 116Te
|-
| 118Xe
| style="text-align:right" | 54
| style="text-align:right" | 64
| 117.916179(11)
| 3.8(9) min
| β+
| 118I
| 0+
|
|
|-
| 119Xe
| style="text-align:right" | 54
| style="text-align:right" | 65
| 118.915411(11)
| 5.8(3) min
| β+
| 119I
| 5/2(+)
|
|
|-
| 120Xe
| style="text-align:right" | 54
| style="text-align:right" | 66
| 119.911784(13)
| 40(1) min
| β+
| 120I
| 0+
|
|
|-
| 121Xe
| style="text-align:right" | 54
| style="text-align:right" | 67
| 120.911462(12)
| 40.1(20) min
| β+
| 121I
| (5/2+)
|
|
|-
| 122Xe
| style="text-align:right" | 54
| style="text-align:right" | 68
| 121.908368(12)
| 20.1(1) h
| β+
| 122I
| 0+
|
|
|-
| 123Xe
| style="text-align:right" | 54
| style="text-align:right" | 69
| 122.908482(10)
| 2.08(2) h
| EC
| 123I
| 1/2+
|
|
|-
| style="text-indent:1em" | 123mXe
| colspan="3" style="text-indent:2em" | 185.18(22) keV
| 5.49(26) μs
|
|
| 7/2(−)
|
|
|-
| 124Xe
| style="text-align:right" | 54
| style="text-align:right" | 70
| 123.905893(2)
| 1.8(5 (stat), 1 (sys)) y
| Double EC
| 124Te 
| 0+
| 9.52(3)×10−4
|
|-
| 125Xe
| style="text-align:right" | 54
| style="text-align:right" | 71
| 124.9063955(20)
| 16.9(2) h
| β+
| 125I
| 1/2(+)
|
|
|-
| style="text-indent:1em" | 125m1Xe
| colspan="3" style="text-indent:2em" | 252.60(14) keV
| 56.9(9) s
| IT
| 125Xe
| 9/2(−)
|
|
|-
| style="text-indent:1em" | 125m2Xe
| colspan="3" style="text-indent:2em" | 295.86(15) keV
| 0.14(3) μs
|
|
| 7/2(+)
|
|
|-
| 126Xe
| style="text-align:right" | 54
| style="text-align:right" | 72
| 125.904274(7)
| colspan=3 align=center|Observationally Stable
| 0+
| 8.90(2)×10−4
|
|-
| 127Xe
| style="text-align:right" | 54
| style="text-align:right" | 73
| 126.905184(4)
| 36.345(3) d
| EC
| 127I
| 1/2+
|
|
|-
| style="text-indent:1em" | 127mXe
| colspan="3" style="text-indent:2em" | 297.10(8) keV
| 69.2(9) s
| IT
| 127Xe
| 9/2−
|
|
|-
| 128Xe
| style="text-align:right" | 54
| style="text-align:right" | 74
| 127.9035313(15)
| colspan=3 align=center|Stable
| 0+
| 0.019102(8)
|
|-
| 129Xe
| style="text-align:right" | 54
| style="text-align:right" | 75
| 128.9047794(8)
| colspan=3 align=center|Stable
| 1/2+
| 0.264006(82)
|
|-
| style="text-indent:1em" | 129mXe
| colspan="3" style="text-indent:2em" | 236.14(3) keV
| 8.88(2) d
| IT
| 129Xe
| 11/2−
|
|
|-
| 130Xe
| style="text-align:right" | 54
| style="text-align:right" | 76
| 129.9035080(8)
| colspan=3 align=center|Stable
| 0+
| 0.040710(13)
|
|-
| 131Xe
| style="text-align:right" | 54
| style="text-align:right" | 77
| 130.9050824(10)
| colspan=3 align=center|Stable
| 3/2+
| 0.212324(30)
|
|-
| style="text-indent:1em" | 131mXe
| colspan="3" style="text-indent:2em" | 163.930(8) keV
| 11.934(21) d
| IT
| 131Xe
| 11/2−
|
|
|-
| 132Xe
| style="text-align:right" | 54
| style="text-align:right" | 78
| 131.9041535(10)
| colspan=3 align=center|Stable
| 0+
| 0.269086(33)
|
|-
| style="text-indent:1em" | 132mXe
| colspan="3" style="text-indent:2em" | 2752.27(17) keV
| 8.39(11) ms
| IT
| 132Xe
| (10+)
|
|
|-
| 133Xe
| style="text-align:right" | 54
| style="text-align:right" | 79
| 132.9059107(26)
| 5.2475(5) d
| β−
| 133Cs
| 3/2+
|
|
|-
| style="text-indent:1em" | 133mXe
| colspan="3" style="text-indent:2em" | 233.221(18) keV
| 2.19(1) d
| IT
| 133Xe
| 11/2−
|
|
|-
| 134Xe
| style="text-align:right" | 54
| style="text-align:right" | 80
| 133.9053945(9)
| colspan=3 align=center|Observationally Stable
| 0+
| 0.104357(21)
|
|-
| style="text-indent:1em" | 134m1Xe
| colspan="3" style="text-indent:2em" | 1965.5(5) keV
| 290(17) ms
| IT
| 134Xe
| 7−
|
|
|-
| style="text-indent:1em" | 134m2Xe
| colspan="3" style="text-indent:2em" | 3025.2(15) keV
| 5(1) μs
|
|
| (10+)
|
|
|-
| 135Xe
| style="text-align:right" | 54
| style="text-align:right" | 81
| 134.907227(5)
| 9.14(2) h
| β−
| 135Cs
| 3/2+
|
|
|-
| rowspan=2 style="text-indent:1em" | 135mXe
| rowspan=2 colspan="3" style="text-indent:2em" | 526.551(13) keV
| rowspan=2|15.29(5) min
| IT (99.99%)
| 135Xe
| rowspan=2|11/2−
| rowspan=2|
| rowspan=2|
|-
| β− (.004%)
| 135Cs
|-
| 136Xe
| style="text-align:right" | 54
| style="text-align:right" | 82
| 135.907219(8)
| 2.165(16 (stat), 59 (sys)) y
|β−β−
| 136Ba
| 0+
| 0.088573(44)
|
|-
| style="text-indent:1em" | 136mXe
| colspan="3" style="text-indent:2em" | 1891.703(14) keV
| 2.95(9) μs
|
| 
| 6+
|
|
|-
| 137Xe
| style="text-align:right" | 54
| style="text-align:right" | 83
| 136.911562(8)
| 3.818(13) min
| β−
| 137Cs
| 7/2−
|
|
|-
| 138Xe
| style="text-align:right" | 54
| style="text-align:right" | 84
| 137.91395(5)
| 14.08(8) min
| β−
| 138Cs
| 0+
|
|
|-
| 139Xe
| style="text-align:right" | 54
| style="text-align:right" | 85
| 138.918793(22)
| 39.68(14) s
| β−
| 139Cs
| 3/2−
|
|
|-
| 140Xe
| style="text-align:right" | 54
| style="text-align:right" | 86
| 139.92164(7)
| 13.60(10) s
| β−
| 140Cs
| 0+
|
|
|-
| rowspan=2|141Xe
| rowspan=2 style="text-align:right" | 54
| rowspan=2 style="text-align:right" | 87
| rowspan=2|140.92665(10)
| rowspan=2|1.73(1) s
| β− (99.45%)
| 141Cs
| rowspan=2|5/2(−#)
| rowspan=2|
| rowspan=2|
|-
| β−, n (.043%)
| 140Cs
|- 
| rowspan=2|142Xe
| rowspan=2 style="text-align:right" | 54
| rowspan=2 style="text-align:right" | 88
| rowspan=2|141.92971(11)
| rowspan=2|1.22(2) s
| β− (99.59%)
| 142Cs
| rowspan=2|0+
| rowspan=2|
| rowspan=2|
|-
| β−, n (.41%)
| 141Cs
|-
| 143Xe
| style="text-align:right" | 54
| style="text-align:right" | 89
| 142.93511(21)#
| 0.511(6) s
| β−
| 143Cs
| 5/2−
|
|
|-
| rowspan=2|144Xe
| rowspan=2 style="text-align:right" | 54
| rowspan=2 style="text-align:right" | 90
| rowspan=2|143.93851(32)#
| rowspan=2|0.388(7) s
| β−
| 144Cs
| rowspan=2|0+
| rowspan=2|
| rowspan=2|
|-
| β−, n
| 143Cs
|-
| 145Xe
| style="text-align:right" | 54
| style="text-align:right" | 91
| 144.94407(32)#
| 188(4) ms
| β−
| 145Cs
| (3/2−)#
|
|
|-
| 146Xe
| style="text-align:right" | 54
| style="text-align:right" | 92
| 145.94775(43)#
| 146(6) ms
| β−
| 146Cs
| 0+
|
|
|-
| rowspan=2|147Xe
| rowspan=2 style="text-align:right" | 54
| rowspan=2 style="text-align:right" | 93
| rowspan=2|146.95356(43)#
| rowspan=2|130(80) ms[0.10(+10−5) s]
| β−
| 147Cs
| rowspan=2|3/2−#
| rowspan=2|
| rowspan=2|
|-
| β−, n
| 146Cs

 The isotopic composition refers to that in air.

Xenon-124
Xenon-124 is an isotope of xenon that undergoes double electron capture to tellurium-124 with a very long half life of  years, more than 12 orders of magnitude longer than the age of the universe.  Such decays have been observed in the XENON1T detector in 2019, and are the rarest processes ever directly observed. (Even slower decays of other nuclei have been measured, but by detecting decay products that have accumulated over billions of years rather than observing them directly.)

Xenon-133
 
Xenon-133 (sold as a drug under the brand name Xeneisol, ATC code ) is an isotope of xenon. It is a radionuclide that is inhaled to assess pulmonary function, and to image the lungs. It is also used to image blood flow, particularly in the brain. 133Xe is also an important fission product. It is discharged to the atmosphere in small quantities by some nuclear power plants.

Xenon-135

Xenon-135 is a radioactive isotope of xenon, produced as a fission product of uranium. It has a half-life of about 9.2 hours and is the most powerful known neutron-absorbing nuclear poison (having a neutron absorption cross-section of 2 million barns). The overall yield of xenon-135 from fission is 6.3%, though most of this results from the radioactive decay of fission-produced tellurium-135 and iodine-135. Xe-135 exerts a significant effect on nuclear reactor operation (xenon pit). It is discharged to the atmosphere in small quantities by some nuclear power plants.

Xenon-136
Xenon-136 is an isotope of xenon that undergoes double beta decay to barium-136 with a very long half life of  years, more than 10 orders of magnitude longer than the age of the universe. It is being used in the Enriched Xenon Observatory experiment to search for neutrinoless double beta decay.

See also 

 Xenon isotope geochemistry

References

 Isotope masses from Ame2003 Atomic Mass Evaluation by Georges Audi, Aaldert Hendrik Wapstra, Catherine Thibault, Jean Blachot and Olivier Bersillon in Nuclear Physics A729 (2003).
 Isotopic compositions and standard atomic masses from:

 Half-life, spin, and isomer data selected from the following sources.

 
Xenon
Xenon